Casewise is a developer of enterprise architecture and business process analysis software with global headquarters in the U.K. and U.S. headquarters in New York City.

In 2016, Casewise was acquired by erwin Inc.

The company has been named to Gartner’s Magic Quadrant annual list of leaders in the fields of Enterprise Architecture Tools, including in 2013 and 2014, and Business Process Analysis Tools, including in 2011 and 2012. In 2013, Forrester Research named Casewise among the 10 most significant software providers of enterprise architecture management suites.

Casewise develops business process analysis software used to document, design and simulate business processes. Based on the client’s industry, Casewise suggests “best practices models and frameworks to speed up their business process initiatives.”  Casewise enterprise architecture software includes Casewise Corporate Modeler, a repository-based modeling and analysis tool based on Microsoft's .NET technology.

Casewise has more than 3,000 clients, which include NASA, Pfizer, CapitalOne, United Healthcare, US Army Corps of Engineers, Southern California Edison, and National Bank of Canada.

In addition to the U.K. and U.S., Casewise has operations in countries which include Belgium, Canada, France, Italy, South Africa, Bahrain, Australia, and Switzerland and its software is available in 14 languages.

Casewise South Africa
In 2011, Casewise South Africa has been a value added reseller and partner of erwin Inc. The Casewise brand has become popular across the fields of Business Process Research, Corporate Process Management, Knowledge Processing, Organizational Infrastructure and Governance, Risk & Policy, incorporating a broad variety of technologies and services; including a strong awareness of vertical industries and economies.

Casewise Australia
Casewise Asia Pacific Pty Ltd is headquartered in Melbourne, Victoria, Australia and is a member of the ID industry. Casewise has only 4 employees and produces 0 million US dollars in revenue.

References

External links
 

Software companies of the United Kingdom
Enterprise architecture